The 40th International Film Festival of India was held from November 23 - December 3, 2009 in Goa. Veteran actors Waheeda Rahman and Mammootty were the Chief guests for the edition. The 75 years of Assamese Cinema was celebrated by a special section featuring five films. Assamese film personalities Jahnu Barua, Gyanada Kakoti, Bidya Rao and Manju Bora were present on the occasion. For the first time, Malegaon industry of remakes received an international platform with the screening of two of their films.

Under Golden Jubilee Retro section, the sterling contributions of film personalities who have completed 50 years in the industry was acknowledged Asha Parekh, Sharmila Tagore and Soumitra Chatterjee. The competition jury was headed by Brazilian director Joao Batista de Andrade. Other members of the jury were Kenichi Okubu (Japan), Jean-Michel Frodon (France), Sarika Takhur (India) and Vic Sarin (Canada).

Winners
Golden Peacock (Best Film): "Cannot Live Without You" by "Leon Dai " (Taiwanese film)
IFFI Best Director Award: "Ounie Lecomte" for "A Brand New Life" (South Korean film).
Silver Peacock Special Jury Award: "Giorgi Ovashvili" for "The Other Bank"  (Georgean film)

Official selections

Special screenings

Opening film
"Wheat" by "He Ping" (Chinese film).

Closing film
"Broken Embraces" by "Pedro Almodóvar" (Spanish film).

References

2009 film festivals
40th
2009 in Indian cinema